An epoch is an instant in time chosen as the origin of a particular calendar era.

Epoch or EPOCH may also refer to:

Time-related
 Any historical era
 Epoch (astronomy), a moment in time used as a reference for the orbital elements of a celestial body
 Epoch (computing), a moment from which system time is usually measured
 Epoch (cosmology) or cosmologic epoch, a phase in the development of the universe since the Big Bang
 On the geologic time scale, an epoch is a span of time smaller than a period and larger than an age
 Epoch (race), racial periods in Blavatsky's esoteric theory of the root races
 Unix epoch, the starting time for Unix-based operating systems

Arts and entertainment
 Epoch (DC Comics), a supervillain also known as the Lord of Time
 Epoch (Marvel Comics), a cosmic entity in the Marvel Comics universe
 Epoch (film), a 2001 American science fiction film
 Epoch (anthology), a 1975 anthology of science fiction stories
 Epoch (video game), a 1981 space combat game for the Apple II
 Epoch (The Brave album), 2016
 Epoch (Tycho album), 2016
 Epoch, a 2006 album by Rip Slyme

Games
 Epoch Co., a Japanese toy and computer games company
 Epoch Game Pocket Computer, an early hand-held game console produced by Epoch Co.
 Epoch (Chrono Trigger), a flying time machine in role-playing game Chrono Trigger
 Epoch Hunter, a boss in Caverns of Time from the game World of Warcraft

Publications
 Epoch (American magazine), literary magazine of Cornell University
 Epoch (Russian magazine), literary magazine by Fyodor Dostoyevsky and his brother Mikhail
 Ha-Tsfira (lit. Epoch), a Hebrew language newspaper published in 1862 and 1874–1931
 The Epoch Times, a privately owned Falun Gong-linked newspaper

Science and technology
 EPOCH (chemotherapy), a chemotherapy regimen
 EPOCh (Extrasolar Planet Observation and Characterization), a NASA mission associated with EPOXI
 Epoch (machine learning), the complete processing of a (typically large) batch of recorded observations by an artificial neural network

Weapons
 Epoch Remote Control Turret

See also
 Epoché
 Belle Epoque (disambiguation)
 Epic (disambiguation)